The Marshfield Central Avenue Historic District is part of the old downtown of Marshfield, Wisconsin. The original wooden downtown burned in a huge fire in 1887. Some of the brick buildings built immediately after the fire still stand - especially near the railroad. Other buildings were added later, and the district includes some off Central, like the old city hall and the depot.

The first downtown
Marshfield was quiet forest until 1872. In that year the Wisconsin Central Railroad cleared a path up through the woods to lay rails, choosing a fairly easy spot to cross the low ridge that runs from north of Marshfield to Neillsville - a spot that would become the city of Marshfield. Anticipating railroad workers and later commerce, Louis and Frank Rivers built a rough two-room hotel/tavern/store out of logs in a clearing just north of the right-of-way, on the spot that is now the parking lot behind Hudson's. This crude structure among the stumps was the first building in what would become Marshfield.

The town grew fast. It was platted in 1875, with streets aligned with the railroad rather than the points of the compass. (The early prominence of the railroad is why Central Avenue was laid out running southwest to northeast.) By 1875 the town had 22 wooden buildings. In 1878 William and Charles Upham built the town's first sawmill and a general store. In 1883 Marshfield was incorporated as a city. By 1885, the population was nearly 2000. To his sawmill, Upham had added a planing mill, a furniture factory, and a flour and feed mill. Other businesses had sprung up selling groceries, ready-made clothes, crockery, jewelry, beer, fresh-baked bread, furniture, and coffins.

The main business of that early railroad was transporting lumber from the surrounding forests and from forests to the north. Upham's sawmill cut some of the lumber into boards and shingles. Naturally, many buildings in the new city were built of wood; Central Avenue was lined with frame stores with boomtown fronts and wooden cornices. The street itself was dirt/mud/dust, but wooden boardwalks ran in front of the stores. Wood was plentiful, cheap, and quick to build with, but also flammable.

On June 27, 1887 a fire started in the Upham plant just south of the tracks. The day was hot and windy, the fire got into Upham's piles of drying wood, and the limited firefighting tools were no match for it. The fire engulfed Upham's factory complex. The sawmill was fed from a millpond where Miller Park now stands, and even the logs floating there caught fire. The fire destroyed the railroad depot, then started down the lines of wooden buildings on Central Avenue. Men tried dynamiting a few stores to create a break in the fuel, but the fire swept through the rubble and jumped the gaps. By the time it burned itself out, every commercial building in town except one had been reduced to ashes. There were no deaths, but it was a disaster for the young city.

Rebuilding after the fire (1887)
The day after the fire, Upham announced that he would rebuild his factories. Learning from the fire, the city required that new buildings on Central Avenue must be clad in fireproof materials - not wood. Reconstruction began almost immediately, with some businesses throwing up temporary wooden shacks in the street in front of their lots from which they could sell while their stores behind were rebuilt in brick. There never was another fire like that.

Many structures built right after the fire still survive, especially just south of the railroad tracks where the business district began. They include:

 The Thomas House Hotel at 103 S. Central is a 3-story brick hotel building on the prominent corner of Central Avenue and the Wisconsin Central's rail corridor - now also the Veterans' Parkway. It has attractive brickwork on both public-facing sides, with Italianate styling including segmentally arched hood moulds over the windows and an elaborate cornice that wraps around the corner of the building. The cornice has bands of brick at different levels and some set diagonally. The door at the northwest corner was set at 45 degrees and flanked by cast iron pilasters. The 1887 fire destroyed an earlier hotel called Travelers Home on the same site. After the fire, this Thomas Hotel operated until 1915. At that point it was bought by Felix La Pointe and renamed Hotel Juneau. In 1920, it was bought by C.E. Blodgett. The building originally lined up with other stores on Central, but when the Parkway was widened, the whole hotel was raised and moved back thirty feet to allow expansion of the intersection.
 The F. Doll building at 107-111 S. Central Avenue is a 2-story cream brick building built in 1887. Like all the 1887 stores, its styling is Italianate, with segmental-arched hood moulds over some of the second story windows, and a cornice with a diamond corbel pattern. The building initially housed a furniture store. By 1891 it was split to house a millinery shop and a saloon, with a dressmaker upstairs. These were followed by a grocery upstairs by 1904, then a confectionery shop by 1912.
 The Noll building at 117-121 S. Central Ave. is a 2-story brick store with the larger northern section built in 1887 and the southern section added by 1891. Again, the second story windows have the original hood moulds and the top of the front is decorated with brickwork. On top of the wall in the center is a short section of parapet bearing the name "Noll." Frank Noll initially operated a hardware store in the building. From 1891 through 1904 he stored agricultural implements in the south addition.
 The building at 137-139 S. Central Ave. is another 2-story brick store with Italianate styling, built between 1887 and 1891. Its street-level storefront still has the original cast iron pilasters and crossbeam. Above, the second story windows have segmental arch hood moulds topped with keystones. Above those runs a cornice with brick corbelling. The building initially housed a boot and shoe store. By 1912 it housed a saloon, and by 1946 a restaurant.
 The Thiel Building at 301-305 S. Central Ave is another 2-story cream brick building, Commercial Vernacular with some Italianate styling, built between 1884 and 1887, but probably after the fire. It sits on a street corner, so has attractive brickwork on two sides, with segmental arches over the second story windows, with a decorated cornice with dentils in the brickwork, and with a stepped parapet labelled "Thiel Building." It first housed a meat shop, with an ice locker in the center of the building and a general store in the south half. In 1898 a hand-printer was on the second floor. It has also housed a furniture store, a saloon in the rear, and a barber shop. In 1916 the newly-formed Marshfield Clinic remodeled the second story and operated their  specialized group practice from it for ten years.
 The building at 307 S. Central Ave. is another 2-story brick building with Italianate styling, built between 1884 and 1887. Again the windows have hood moulds and keystones, but this building is framed in pilasters, and the cornice is more exuberant than most, with corbels, arcade, and a decorated triangular pediment in the center. A saloon occupied the building until 1898, then a grocery store by 1904. By 1946 it housed a restaurant.
 The store at 160 S. Central Ave. was also built between 1884 and 1887, and is a 2-story brick store similar to others of that era, except that the pilasters that frame the side curve at the top to merge into the cornice. It first housed a bakery, then by 1891 a confectionary shop. By 1904 it was split between a flour and feed shop and a jewelry store, then a barber.

The east side of the 100 block is remarkably intact; almost the whole block was built right after 1887. Buildings in other places were also constructed right after the fire, but no longer exist. For example, the Wisconsin Central rebuilt its depot, but it burned in 1907.

Pre-WWI (1888-1915)
With the rebuilding of Upham's factories, Marshfield had jobs and the town's economy moved forward. In 1890 A.K. Hatteberg from Upham's company formed his own veneer factory, which eventually became Roddis Lumber and Veneer. Other woodworking factories included H.H. Bille's Sash and Door and the Stave Factory. But the pine was running out, and things were changing. Upham's sawmill closed in 1899.

Local cheesemaking had begun in 1885 at Nasonville, and proved to be profitable, so other cheese factories began to pop up in the neighboring country. In 1907 the first cold storage plant was built in town. In 1911 the Blum Brothers began manufacturing cheese boxes. All of these, together with the rail connection, made Marshfield a hub for shipping cheese from the area to markets like Milwaukee and Chicago.  C.E. Blodgett's Cheese, Butter and Egg Company became the largest firm of this type in the state.

By 1910 the town's population was 5,783.

While the structures built immediately after the fire were all Italianate-influenced, these later buildings are more varied:
 The store at 166 S. Central Ave. was built between 1891 and 1898 - a 2-story brick building with Italianate details, with a parapet with courses of bricks in different patterns. The building housed a boot and shoe store through 1904 at least, then a pool room. Between 1912 and 1925 a bakery replaced the pool room, and around that time the street-level storefront was replaced with new show windows and the black glass veneer - more of an Art Deco style, which came into fashion around that time. This remodeling of the street-level storefront to fit fashions while leaving the upper stories untouched was common on many buildings over the years. 
 The Deming Building at 201-207 S. Central Ave. is a 2-story building in Commercial Vernacular style on a street corner. It was built in 1898 and housed a store that sold dry goods, shoes and clothes on the first floor, and offices above, including those of the owner, lawyer Edgar M. Deming. It later hosted a barber and a variety store.
 The building at 126 S. Central Ave. was built between 1898 and 1904 to match the adjacent building at 132 S. Central, which was built after the fire. It has a cornice with recessed panels and various courses of bricks. The oriel window was added between 1904 and 1912. It initially housed a saloon. By 1912 it housed the Majestic Hotel. Later it housed a store, a restaurant, and in more recent times, Jimmy's Cafe and 2 Cups.
 The old Marshfield Public Library at 204 S Maple Ave is a Neoclassical brick building designed by Van Ryn & DeGelleke of Milwaukee and built by C.F. Dallman in 1900. Walls are red brick, with corner pilasters, a broad white entablature, a hip roof, and a pediment above the main entrance. If the rough fieldstone foundation seems a bit incongruous under the formal building, it was left that way because it was originally buried. The main entrance was originally a story above the present one, where the large window under the pediment is. Marshfield had a library since 1880, but this was the first dedicated library building. Previously the book collection had been housed on the second floor of C.M. Upham's store, Budge's Drug Store, Band of Hope Hall, Elvis's jewelry store, and Mrs. Tiffault's Book Store and Bazaar.
 The old Marshfield City Hall at 110 E 2nd St is an eclectic-styled building built in 1901. It stands two stories tall with a full attic, and is framed by a tall clock tower on one corner, and a hip-roofed fire tower on another corner. It also was designed by Van Ryn & DeGelleke and built of red brick produced in Marshfield. The round-arched windows and dramatic asymmetry are drawn from Romanesque Revival style; the columns and the dentilled eaves suggest Neoclassical style; the style of the parapet dormers is perhaps Flemish Renaissance Revival. The building initially housed the fire department, with horse stables, and the new city library.
 The third Wisconsin Central Depot (now Royal Tokyo restaurant) was built in 1910. It is Craftsman-styled, with wide, overhanging eaves to shelter travelers from rain. The railroad's first depot had burned in the fire of 1887. The second depot burned in 1907. This third one was built with rusticated stone walls, and it did not burn. The depot originally sat to the north of its present location, just south of the tracks, but was moved in the 2000s to make space for the Veterans Parkway.

The historic district also included some other buildings built north of the tracks in this era, which were razed in the 2000s for Veteran's Parkway and Kwik Trip. Most interesting was the Baumann Building at 101 N. Central, a 2-story Italianate with wide overhanging eaves built between 1891 and 1898, which housed a saloon and Saenger Hall, where the Marshfield Mannerchor met, and in 1915 the Deutscher Krieger Verein.

WWI and after
Beginning in 1914, Central Avenue was paved in brick from "A" Street (now Arnold) north of the tracks south to 9th Street. Around the same time, Central became part of Wisconsin's state highway system, meaning more traffic through town. By 1925 the town had 7,400 people and about 1500 cars. Various garages and service stations were built along Central Avenue.

The contributing buildings from this period are:

 The Charles Hotel at 168-172 S. Central Ave. stands above the adjacent buildings, a 3-story hotel running far down the side street. The first section built in 1925 ran to the alley. An addition in 1928 bridged the alley and continued similar construction further back, except that section's street-level shops are framed in an arcade. The  walls are red brick trimmed with lighter concrete. The style is eclectic, with the window bays on the third floor styled Neoclassical, each like a little Greek temple with pilasters on each side and a pediment on top. Concrete belt courses run the length of the building, connecting the windows in a hint of 20th Century Commercial style. The decorative parapet completes the design. The hotel was built by Charles E. Blodgett, who moved his hotel operation here from his smaller Blodgett Hotel.
 The building at 209-211 S. Central Ave is a 2-story Art Deco-styled building with sculptured metal relief panels depicting human figures above the windows. These are framed by a sandstone veneer that covers the whole second story facade. The facade at least was probably constructed in the 1930s or 1940s. It was occupied by Citizens National Bank, and the panels on the front may have symbolized citizens.

References

Historic districts on the National Register of Historic Places in Wisconsin
National Register of Historic Places in Wood County, Wisconsin